The lightweight competition at the 2015 AIBA World Boxing Championships will be held from 7–15 October 2015. This is a qualifying tournament for the upcoming 2016 Summer Olympics. Lázaro Álvarez of Cuba defeated Albert Selimov of Azerbaijan to win the world title.

Medalists

Seeds

  Lázaro Álvarez 
  Robson Conceição (Semifinals)
  Albert Selimov
  Otgondalai Dorjnyambuu (Quarterfinals)

Draw

Finals

Section 1

Section 2

Results

Ranking

References

External links
Official website

2015 AIBA World Boxing Championships